Michael Woolston Ash (March 5, 1789 – December 14, 1858) was an American politician who served as a Jacksonian member of the U.S. House of Representatives for Pennsylvania's 3rd congressional district from 1835 to 1837.

Ash was born in Philadelphia. He studied law, was admitted to the bar on June 21, 1811, and commenced practice in Philadelphia.  He served as a first lieutenant and regimental adjutant in the First Pennsylvania Militia Volunteers during the War of 1812.  At the close of the war he went into partnership with James Buchanan, who became the 15th President of the United States, and continued the practice of his profession in Philadelphia.

Ash was elected as a Jacksonian to the Twenty-fourth Congress.  He was not a candidate for reelection in 1836 to the Twenty-fifth Congress.  He practiced law until his death in Philadelphia in 1858.

He was interred at the Christ Church Burial Ground in Philadelphia, Pennsylvania and re-interred at Laurel Hill Cemetery.

References

Sources

The Political Graveyard

1789 births
1858 deaths
Politicians from Philadelphia
Lawyers from Philadelphia
Jacksonian members of the United States House of Representatives from Pennsylvania
American militia officers
American militiamen in the War of 1812
Burials at Christ Church, Philadelphia